This is a list of  Castles and other such fortifications and palaces or country homes in Germany. Included are castles, forts, palaces, country or stately homes and manors, and even follies.

Use

See also 
 List of castles in the Eifel

 
Germany